Ammi Ruhamah Cutter may refer to:
 Ammi Ruhamah Cutter (minister)
 Ammi Ruhamah Cutter (physician)